Valentina Diaz may refer to:

Valentina Diaz (Devious Maids), a fictional character on American television comedy-drama series Devious Maids
Valentina Díaz (born 2001), Chilean footballer